Metamora; or, The Last of the Wampanoags is a play written in 1829 by John Augustus Stone. It was first performed December 15, 1829, at the Park Theater in New York City, starring Edwin Forrest.

History 
On November 28, 1828, a contest was posted in the New York Critic by American actor Edwin Forrest offering a prize of 500 dollars for an original play which met such criteria as, “a tragedy, in five acts, of which the hero, or principal character, shall be an aboriginal of this country". Forrest, looking to produce a play suiting his strengths, created the contest as an opportunity to boost his acting career. With his play, Metamora, or the Last of the Wampanoags, playwright and actor John Augustus Stone stood out among his competitors and took home the prize. The play, which opened on December 15, 1829, was an instant hit. Due to a combination of the highly publicized contest, Forrest's growing celebrity, and the timely subject matter of the play itself, the performances resonated with audiences across the growing country, earning theaters record profits, of which Stone received very little. Although Stone had written many other plays Metamora was by far the most critically acclaimed. After its debut the play quickly spread into various cities where it was continuously performed.  During the 19th century there were over seventy-five Indian Dramas written, and even though Metamora shared a very similar plot line as the rest of plays, it was the only one to be successful.

John Augustus Stone
John Augustus Stone was born in Concord, Massachusetts on December 15, 1800. He started his theatrical career as an actor in his early 20s, portraying mostly comic roles, and was considered a crowd favorite in the New York Theatres. Later on, he married an actress and together they had two sons who became actors as well. Again, while Stone was respected and known for the play, the name associated with Metamora was Edwin Forrest- in fact Stone's name is not on one surviving poster. Stone struggled with poor health issues and at the age of thirty-three committed suicide by jumping off the Spruce Street landing on June 1, 1834.  Forrest was extremely grateful to Stone not only for his friendship, but for the role that changed his life, as well as his career. When Stone died, Forrest placed a monument on his grave that said,  “To the Memory of John Augustus Stone, Author of Metamora, by His Friend Edwin Forrest."

Synopsis 
Metamora is set in 17th century New England around the arrival of the Puritans. The story deals with the conflict between the New English settlers, specifically Walter and Oceana, and the Wampanoags, specifically Metamora and his wife, Nehmeokee. Metamora is a tragic, noble Indian hero turned violent only by force. In the beginning there is actually peace, and a willingness to collaborate between the Wampanoags and the Puritans, however, as the play progresses, so does the rising conflict that leads to the full-on attack on Metamora's tribe. During the ending scene, Stone provides the long-awaited marriage between Walter and Oceana. However, in the last moment, Metamora kills his wife in order to protect her from the New English settlers’ invasion, leaving the audience with the image of Metamora, his wife, and his son all slain as a result of the white man. He cursed the English with his final breath.

Themes and criticism 
Though Metamora is referred to as an Indian tragedy, its themes of love, war, dramatic deaths and suicides, and declaratory speeches make the play better described as a romantic melodrama. The depiction of Metamora as a kind and “noble savage,” turned violent by force especially resonated with the mid-19th century audience. Most critics raved over the play, however, some critical response was negative, and as one critic very harshly put it, “Mr. Stone did what he could to atone for the injury which he had inflicted upon the world by the production of this play. He drowned himself. We will accept the presumptive apology.”

American character types: the Indian 
In the years following such pivotal events in history as the American Revolution and the War of 1812, a strong feeling of nationalism infiltrated early America. This sense of national pride influenced not only everyday life, but also became evident in the arts, including early American theatre. After a time when mostly British theatre was performed in America, a desire to create drama specific to America emerged. America needed to establish itself in the midst of the well-developed drama and literature of other nations, as well as set a standard for what is uniquely American. However, this need for nationalism soon manifested itself in drama through American character types: the Negro, the Yankee, and in the case of Metamora, the Indian. As historian Walter Meserve points out, “American literature became identifiable only after writers had recognized the potential of American scenery, custom, characters, and ideas... in a sense, they were bound together by a similar desire for freedom: the Yankee from the English, the Indian from the Yankees, and the Negro from bondage.” Depictions of oppressed, underdog characters such as the Yankee, Negro, and Indian overcoming captivity, or dying gloriously, represented the themes of freedom and liberty that characterized the newly independent America.

Indian drama 
In the nineteenth century, about seventy-five Indian-related plays were written. The success of Metamora was due to Stone's ability to create a lead character that was a combination of the sublime, the grotesque, and the natural state in order to produce a believable and gratifying story. Not only did he create a character that the audience could believe, but that the audience could sympathize with. The first American play with an Indian hero was a closet drama from 1776, marking the beginning of what would become one of the biggest trends of the century. The character Metamora was inspired by New England Chief, Metacom or King Philip, who was famous for attacking the English in 1675–1676. In 1671 the English settlers grew suspicious of Metacom and demanded that the tribe surrender their guns. Finally in 1675 when three Wampanoag's were tried and executed for the murder of another Native American, who had been acting as an informer for the settlers, Metacom led a bloody uprising. This marked the last major attempt by the Indians to drive out the New England Settlers. It lasted for fourteen months and twelve frontier towns were destroyed as a result. The war came to an end in August 1676 when Metacom was captured and executed. Though King Philip's War was greatly ignored by the public, it “stands as perhaps the most devastating war in this country’s history."

Metamora and the Indian Removal Act 
Opening only one year before the passage of Andrew Jackson’s Indian Removal Act, Metamora’s depiction of a scorned and violent savage against English settler victims raises questions about the motives of both Forrest and Stone. In an essay analyzing the issue, Scott Martin remarks, “Recent interpretations insist that Stone’s play and Forrest’s personation of the title character, coming as they did when the fate of the southeastern tribes emerged as an urgent issue in congressional debate and the public mind, represented more than a mere coincidence in the realm of popular culture." Mark Mallett argues that Forrest's partiality to the Democratic Party, and to Jackson, was the driving force behind Metamora. “Forrest’s play,” he asserts, “brought the Democrat’s message back into the theatre... effectively distracting public attention from the horrors of the government’s Indian Removal campaign.” However, others contend that Metamora was simply a vehicle for Forrest's career and a story that suited the romantic ideals of its audience. “The overemphasis of political and racial ideology as the preeminent analytical context may cloud rather than clarify the relationship between Metamora and Jacksonian Indian policy. A close consideration of Metamora’s place in antebellum culture, and the contexts in which it can be interpreted, should give pause to scholars who are quick to detect efforts to engineer political advantage in very corner of art and popular culture."

Revivals
In October 2004, the play was performed at the Metropolitan Playhouse in New York City as Metamora: Last of the Wampanoags!, directed by Alex Roe and starring Matthew Trumbull as Metamora.

Bibliography
Metamora: Or, the Last of the Wampanoags, Feedback Theatre Books, August 1996, 
Barrett, Lawrence. American Actor Series: Edwin Forrest. Bronx: Benjamin Blom, Inc., 1881
Martin, Scott C. “‘Metamora’: Nationalism, Theater, and Jacksonian Indian Policy.” Journal of the Early Republic, Vol. 19, No. 1. Spring: University of Pennsylvania Press, 1999. JSTOR.org. 2, Mar. 2011 <https://www.jstor.org/stable/3124923>.
Meserve, Walter J. An Outline History of American Drama. 2nd ed. New York: Feedback Theatrebooks; Brooklin: Prospero Press, 1994.
“Metamora, by John Augustus Stone ROMANTICIZING WAR.” Metropolitan Play House. n.d. Web. 2/24/16
Moody, Richard. Dramas from the American Theatre 1762–1909. Cleveland: The World Publishing Company, 1966.
Rees, James. The Life of Edwin Forrest. With Reminiscences and Personal Recollections. Philadelphia: T.B. Peterson and Brothers, 1874.
Stone, John Augustus. Metamora: Or, The Last of The Wampanoags. 1829. Web.

See also
"Metamora, by John Augustus Stone ROMANTICIZING WAR", Metropolitan Play House
"The last Indian" syndrome revisited: Metamora, take two., Intertexts 22-March-06

References

Plays by John Augustus Stone
1829 plays
Native Americans in popular culture
New England in fiction
Plays set in the United States
Plays about race and ethnicity
Fictional Native American people
Works about Native Americans